Charles Wong Gye (1839–1911) was a notable New Zealand storekeeper, policeman and interpreter. He was born in Canton, China in about 1839.

References

1839 births
1911 deaths
New Zealand police officers
Chinese emigrants to New Zealand
Interpreters
19th-century translators